Yelena Aleksandrovna Sokolova (born 23 July 1986 in Belgorod) is a Russian long jumper.

She finished fifth at the 2007 European Indoor Championships, and won the silver medal at the 2007 Summer Universiade. In 2009, she won the silver medal at the 2009 European Indoor Championships with an indoor personal best of 6.84 metres. She subsequently competed at the 2009 World Championships without reaching the final, and she finished second at the 2009 World Athletics Final.

In August 2012, she won the silver medal at the 2012 Summer Olympics with a personal best jump of 7.07 metres.

International competitions

See also
List of Olympic medalists in athletics (women)
List of 2012 Summer Olympics medal winners
Long jump at the Olympics
List of European Athletics Indoor Championships medalists (women)

References

1986 births
Living people
People from Belgorod
Sportspeople from Belgorod Oblast
Russian female long jumpers
Olympic female long jumpers
Olympic athletes of Russia
Olympic silver medalists for Russia
Olympic silver medalists in athletics (track and field)
Athletes (track and field) at the 2012 Summer Olympics
Medalists at the 2012 Summer Olympics
Universiade medalists in athletics (track and field)
Universiade silver medalists for Russia
Medalists at the 2007 Summer Universiade
Medalists at the 2013 Summer Universiade
European Games gold medalists for Russia
European Games medalists in athletics
Athletes (track and field) at the 2019 European Games
World Athletics Championships athletes for Russia
Authorised Neutral Athletes at the World Athletics Championships
Russian Athletics Championships winners
Diamond League winners